The 1954 BYU Cougars football team was an American football team that represented Brigham Young University (BYU) as a member of the Skyline Conference during the 1954 college football season. In their sixth season under head coach Chick Atkinson, the Cougars compiled an overall record of 1–8 with a mark of 1–6 against conference opponents, finished last out of eight teams in the Skyline, and were outscored by a total of 188 to 96.

The team's statistical leaders included Ron Bean with 441 yards of total offense (4 rushing, 437 passing), Dick Felt with 379 rushing yards, and Phil Oyler with 18 points scored.

Schedule

References

BYU
BYU Cougars football seasons
BYU Cougars football